Kevin Spacey Fowler (born July 26, 1959) is an American actor. He began his career as a stage actor during the 1980s, obtaining supporting roles before gaining a leading man status in film and television. Spacey has received various accolades for his performances on stage and screen including two Academy Awards, a BAFTA Award, a Tony Award, two Laurence Olivier Awards, and four Screen Actors Guild Awards. He received nominations for a Grammy Award as well as twelve Primetime Emmy Awards. Spacey received a star on the Hollywood Walk of Fame in 1999, and was named an honorary Commander and Knight Commander of the Order of the British Empire in 2010 and 2015, respectively.

His first film roles were in the Mike Nichols films Heartburn (1986) and Working Girl (1988). Spacey received two Academy Awards, the first for Best Supporting Actor for The Usual Suspects (1995) and the second for Best Actor for American Beauty (1999). He starred in the neo-noir crime film L.A. Confidential earning a BAFTA Award for Best Actor in a Leading Role nomination. His other notable films include Glengarry Glen Ross (1992), Swimming with Sharks (1994),  Se7en (1995) Pay It Forward (2000), Superman Returns (2006), Margin Call (2011), Horrible Bosses (2011), Baby Driver (2017). He directed Albino Alligator (1996), and the musical biopic Beyond the Sea (2004), starring as Bobby Darrin in the latter.

In Broadway theatre, Spacey starred in the revival of Eugene O'Neill's Long Day's Journey into Night in 1986 alongside Jack Lemmon. He won a Tony Award in 1991 for his role in Lost in Yonkers. Spacey continued to act in theatre, receiving his second Tony Award nomination and first Laurence Olivier Award win for his performance in the revival of The Iceman Cometh in 1999. In 2011, Spacey portrayed Richard III in Richard III and Clarence Darrow in Darrow in 2015 in the West End. He was the artistic director of the Old Vic theatre in London from 2004 until stepping down in mid-2015 and received the Laurence Olivier Award for Society of London Theatre Special Award. In 2017, he hosted the 71st Tony Awards.

Spacey portrayed Ron Klain in the HBO movie Recount (2008) receiving a Primetime Emmy Award for Outstanding Actor in a Limited Series or Movie nomination. That same year, he produced the HBO film Bernard and Doris (2008) receiving a nomination for the Primetime Emmy Award for Outstanding Television Movie. From 2013 to 2017, he starred as Frank Underwood in the Netflix political drama series House of Cards, which won him a Golden Globe Award for Best Actor – Television Series Drama and two consecutive Screen Actors Guild Awards for Outstanding Actor in a Drama Series as well as five consecutive Primetime Emmy Award for Outstanding Lead Actor in a Drama Series nominations.

In October 2017, actor Anthony Rapp accused Spacey of making a sexual advance toward him in 1986, when Rapp was 14. This was followed by a number of other high-profile accusations against Spacey. In the wake of these accusations, Netflix cut ties with Spacey, shelving his film Gore and removing him from the last season of House of Cards. His role as J. Paul Getty in Ridley Scott's film All the Money in the World (2017) was reshot with Christopher Plummer in his place. Rapp's allegation was brought to trial in a 2022 lawsuit in New York, with the jury finding Spacey not liable. Spacey is facing criminal charges for an alleged sexual assault in the UK, with his trial set to begin in June 2023.

Early life and education
Kevin Spacey Fowler was born in South Orange, New Jersey, to Kathleen Ann (née Knutson), a secretary, and Thomas Geoffrey Fowler, a technical writer and data consultant. His family relocated to Southern California when he was four years old. Spacey has a sister and an older brother, Randy Fowler, from whom Spacey is estranged. His brother has stated that their father, whom he described as a racist "Nazi supporter", was sexually and physically abusive, and that Spacey shut down emotionally and became "very sly and smart" to avoid beatings. Spacey first addressed the matter in October 2022, saying that his father was "a white supremacist and a neo-Nazi" who would call him "an F-word that is very derogatory to the gay community". He stated that this caused him to become extremely private about his personal life and was why he did not come out as gay earlier in his life. Spacey had previously described his father as "a very normal, middle-class man".

Spacey attended Northridge Military Academy, Canoga Park High School in the 10th and 11th grades. He graduated co-valedictorian (along with Mare Winningham) of the class of 1977 of Chatsworth High School in Chatsworth, California. At Chatsworth, Spacey starred in the school's senior production of The Sound of Music, playing the part of Captain Georg von Trapp, with Winningham as Maria von Trapp. He started using his middle name "Spacey", which was his paternal grandmother's maiden name.

Spacey had tried to succeed as a comedian for several years before attending the Juilliard School in New York City, as a member of Group 12, where he studied drama with teacher Marian Seldes between 1979 and 1981. During this time period, he performed stand-up comedy in bowling alley talent contests.

Career

Theatre

1981–1986: Career beginnings in theatre 
Spacey's first professional stage appearance was as a spear carrier in a New York Shakespeare Festival performance of Henry VI, Part 1 in 1981. The following year, he made his first Broadway appearance, as Oswald in a production of Henrik Ibsen's Ghosts, starring Liv Ullmann and director John Neville, which opened at the Eisenhower Theater in Washington's Kennedy Center. He then portrayed Philinte in Molière's The Misanthrope. In 1984, Spacey appeared in a production of David Rabe's Hurlyburly, in which he rotated through each of the male parts (he would later play Mickey in the film version). Next came Anton Chekhov's The Seagull alongside David Strathairn and Colleen Dewhurst. In 1986, Spacey appeared in a production of Sleuth in a New Jersey dinner theatre.

1986–1991: Broadway success and Tony win 
Spacey's prominence as a stage actor began in 1986, when he was cast opposite Jack Lemmon, Peter Gallagher, and Bethel Leslie, as Jamie, the eldest Tyrone son, in Jonathan Miller's lauded production of Eugene O'Neill's Long Day's Journey into Night. Lemmon in particular would become a mentor to Spacey and was invited, along with Spacey's high school drama teacher, to be present when Spacey received his star on the Hollywood Walk of Fame in 1999.

Spacey remained actively involved in the live theatre community. In 1991, he won a Tony Award for his portrayal of Uncle Louie in Neil Simon's Broadway hit Lost in Yonkers. His father was unconvinced that Spacey could make a career for himself as an actor and did not change his mind until Spacey became well known. In 1999, Spacey won the Laurence Olivier Award for Best Actor and earned another Tony Award nomination in 1999 for The Iceman Cometh.

2003–2015: Artistic director of the Old Vic
In February 2003, Spacey announced that he was to become the artistic director of the Old Vic, one of London's oldest theatres. Appearing at a press conference with Judi Dench and Elton John, Spacey promised both to appear on stage and to bring in big-name talent. He undertook to remain in the post for a full ten years. The Old Vic Theatre Company staged shows eight months out of the year. Spacey's first season started in September 2004, opening with the British premiere of the play Cloaca by Maria Goos, directed by Spacey, which opened to mixed reviews. In the 2005 season, Spacey made his UK Shakespearean debut, to good notices, in the title role of Richard II, directed by Trevor Nunn.

On June 16, 2016, Spacey was awarded an honorary knighthood for his services to theatre, arts education, and international culture in the 2015 Queen's Birthday Honours.  The honour, Knight Commander of the Order of the British Empire, was given at Clarence House by then-Prince Charles. As a non-Commonwealth Realm citizen, the award is honorary and he is not entitled to the honorific "Sir". Spacey had previously been awarded the lesser rank of honorary Commander of the Order of the British Empire (CBE) for services to drama in 2010.

Spacey was a patron of the Shakespeare Schools Festival, a charity that enables school children across the UK to perform Shakespeare in professional theatres. He also sits on the board of directors of the Motion Picture and Television Fund.

In mid 2006, Spacey said that he was having the time of his life working at the Old Vic; at that point in his career, he said, he was "trying to do things now that are much bigger and outside [myself]". Spacey performed in productions of National Anthems by Dennis McIntyre, and The Philadelphia Story by Philip Barry, in which he played C.K. Dexter Haven, the Cary Grant role in the film version. Critics applauded Spacey for taking on the management of a theatre, but noted that while his acting was impressive, his skills and judgment as a producer/manager had yet to develop.

In the 2006 season, Spacey suffered a major setback with a production of Arthur Miller's Resurrection Blues, directed by Robert Altman. Despite an all-star cast (including Matthew Modine and future House of Cards co-star Neve Campbell) and the pedigree of Miller's script, Spacey's decision to lure Altman to the stage proved disastrous: after a fraught rehearsal period, the play opened to a critical panning, and closed after only a few weeks. Later in the year, Spacey starred in Eugene O'Neill's A Moon for the Misbegotten, along with Colm Meaney and Eve Best. The play received excellent reviews for Spacey and Best, and was transferred to Broadway in 2007. For the spring part of the 2007–08 season, Jeff Goldblum and Laura Michelle Kelly joined Spacey as the three characters in David Mamet's 1988 play Speed-the-Plow.

In 2009, he directed the premiere of Joe Sutton's Complicit, with Richard Dreyfuss, David Suchet and Elizabeth McGovern. Later that year, Trevor Nunn directed Spacey in a revival of Inherit the Wind. Spacey played defense lawyer Henry Drummond, a role that was made famous by Spencer Tracy in the 1960 film of the same name. Sam Mendes directed Spacey in Shakespeare's Richard III; Spacey played the title role. The show began in June 2011, commencing a worldwide tour culminating in New York in early 2012. In March 2014, it was announced that Spacey would star in a one-man play at the Old Vic to celebrate his ten years as artistic director. He took on the part of Clarence Darrow in the play.

Film

1986–1994: Early roles and breakthrough 
In 1986, Spacey made his first film appearance in Mike Nichols's Heartburn starring Meryl Streep, and Jack Nicholson. Spacey plays a small role credited as a subway thief. In 1988 Spacey also briefly appeared in another Nichols film, Working Girl, as businessman Bob Speck. Some of Spacey's other early roles include a widowed millionaire on L.A. Law; the television miniseries The Murder of Mary Phagan (1988), opposite Lemmon; and the comedy See No Evil, Hear No Evil (1989). Spacey quickly developed a reputation as a character actor, and was cast in bigger roles, including the malevolent office manager in the ensemble film adaptation of the David Mamet play Glengarry Glen Ross (1992) starring Al Pacino, as well as news reporter Harry Kingsley in a film based on a 1917 dog sled race Iron Will (1994) directed by Charles Haid. Spacey also played one-half of a bickering Connecticut couple alongside Judy Davis in the dark comedy Christmas film The Ref (1994), and a malicious Hollywood studio boss in the satire Swimming with Sharks (1995).

1995–1999: Rise to stardom and awards success 

Spacey's performance as the enigmatic criminal Verbal Kint in Bryan Singer's 1995 neo-noir film The Usual Suspects won him the Academy Award for Best Supporting Actor.

In 1995, Spacey also appeared in the David Fincher detective thriller Seven, making a sudden entrance late in the film as serial killer John Doe after going uncredited and unmentioned in the film's advertisements and opening credits. His work in Seven, The Usual Suspects and Outbreak earned him Best Supporting Actor honors at the 1995 Society of Texas Film Critics Awards. Spacey played an egomaniacal district attorney in A Time to Kill (1996) and founded Trigger Street Productions in 1997 with the purpose of producing and developing entertainment across various media. Spacey made his directorial debut with the film Albino Alligator (1996). The film was a box office bomb, grossing $339,379 with a budget of $6 million, but critics praised Spacey's direction. He also voiced Hopper in the animated film A Bug's Life (1998).

Throughout his career, Spacey has been well known for playing villains; he remarked in 2013: "I think people just like me evil for some reason. They want me to be a son of a bitch."

In 1999, Spacey acted alongside Annette Bening in Sam Mendes's American Beauty. In the film he played the role of Lester Burnham, a depressed suburban father and advertising executive who becomes attracted to his teenage daughter's best friend. For this role, Spacey won his second Oscar, this time for Best Actor in a Leading Role. In his acceptance speech he dedicated his Oscar to Jack Lemmon, praising him as an influence, mentor, and father figure. He also stated, "[Lemmon's] performance in The Apartment stands as one of the finest we've ever had". That same year, he was honored with a star on the Hollywood Walk of Fame.

2000–2009: Continued work 
Spacey played a physically and emotionally scarred grade school teacher in Pay It Forward (2000), a patient in a mental institution who may or may not be an alien in K-Pax (2001), and singer Bobby Darin in Beyond the Sea (2004). The latter was a lifelong dream project for Spacey, who took on co-writing, directing, co-producing and starring duties in the biography/musical about Darin's life, career and relationship with actress Sandra Dee. Facing little interest for backing in the U.S., Spacey went to the United Kingdom and Germany for funding. Almost all of the film was made in Berlin. Spacey provided his own vocals on the film's soundtrack and appeared in several tribute concerts around the time of its release. Spacey received mostly positive reviews for his singing, as well as a Golden Globe nomination for his performance. However, reviewers debated the age disparity between Spacey and Darin, noting that Spacey was too old to convincingly portray Darin, particularly during the early stages of the singer's life depicted in the film.

In 2006, Spacey played Lex Luthor in the Bryan Singer superhero film Superman Returns starring Brandon Routh. He was to return for its 2009 sequel, but the series was instead rebooted with the 2013 film Man of Steel. Spacey also appeared in Edison, which received a direct-to-video release in 2006. The film was released in theaters in Netherlands on March 12, 2006.

In 2008, Spacey played a Massachusetts Institute of Technology (MIT) lecturer in the film 21. The film is based on Ben Mezrich's best seller Bringing Down the House: The Inside Story of Six MIT Students Who Took Vegas for Millions, a story of student MIT card-counters who used mathematical probability to aid them in card games such as blackjack. In early 2010, Spacey went to China to star in writer-director Dayyan Eng's black comedy film Inseparable, becoming the first Hollywood actor to star in a fully Chinese-funded film.

2011–2016: Independent films and comedies 

In 2011, Spacey starred in J.C. Chandor's financial thriller Margin Call alongside Paul Bettany, Jeremy Irons, Zachary Quinto, Demi Moore, and Stanley Tucci. The story at large takes place over a 24-hour period at a large Wall Street investment bank during the initial stages of the financial crisis of 2007–2008. The film, which focuses on the actions taken by a group of employees during the subsequent financial collapse, made its debut at the Sundance Film Festival to critical acclaim. Spacey received the Independent Spirit Robert Altman Award along with the cast. That same year, Spacey co-starred in the black comedy film Horrible Bosses, which grossed over $209.6 million at the box office. In 2013 he executive-produced the biographical survival thriller film Captain Phillips, which was nominated for the Academy Award for Best Picture.

He starred as President Richard Nixon in the comedy-drama Elvis & Nixon (2016), which is based on the meeting that took place between Nixon and singer Elvis Presley (Michael Shannon) in December 1970 wherein Presley requested Nixon swear him in as an undercover agent in the Bureau of Narcotics and Dangerous Drugs. He next starred in the comedy film Nine Lives, as a man trapped in the body of a cat. The film was released on August 5, 2016.

In January 2016 it was announced that Relativity Media, which was just emerging from Chapter 11 bankruptcy, had acquired Trigger Street Productions and that Spacey would become chairman of Relativity Studios, while Dana Brunetti would become the studio's president. Spacey called the move "an incredible opportunity to make great entertainment" and said he considered it the "next evolution in my career". However, when the paperwork for the studio was filed for the court, it emerged that Spacey had opted out of assuming the chairmanship of the studios, and by the end of 2016 Brunetti had also left Relativity, while both remained executive producers on House of Cards and Manifesto.

2017–present: Career controversy 
In March 2017, it was announced that Spacey would portray J. Paul Getty in Ridley Scott's All the Money in the World. He shot his role in the film in ten days over the summer of 2017. However, owing to the sexual assault allegations against Spacey, it was announced on November 8, 2017, that all of his footage would be excised, and that Christopher Plummer would replace Spacey as Getty in reshoots. In spite of the very tight schedule, TriStar Pictures completed the new version of the film in time for a December 25 release.

Spacey appeared in the film Billionaire Boys Club, which had a limited release on August 17, 2018. Vertical Entertainment stated that they would be taking no action to remove Spacey from the film, as it had been completed in late 2016, prior to the allegations made in October 2017.

Television

1987–1994: Television debut and early roles 
In 1987, Spacey made his first major television appearance in the second-season premiere of Crime Story, playing a Kennedy-esque American senator. That same year he appeared in spy thriller series The Equalizer as Detective Sergeant Cole in the episode "Solo". He earned a fan base after playing the criminally insane arms dealer Mel Profitt on the television series Wiseguy (1988).

2003–2012: HBO projects and other work 
Spacey hosted Saturday Night Live twice: first in 1997 with musical guest Beck and special guests Michael Palin and John Cleese from Monty Python's Flying Circus and again in May 2006 with musical guest Nelly Furtado.

In 2008 Spacey starred as Ron Klain in the HBO original political drama film Recount revolving around Florida's vote recount during the 2000 United States presidential election between George W. Bush and Al Gore. The film was written by Danny Strong and directed by Jay Roach and starred Bob Balaban, Laura Dern, John Hurt, Denis Leary, and Tom Wilkinson. The television film won three Primetime Emmy Awards, including Outstanding Television Movie. For his performance in the film, Spacey was nominated for the Primetime Emmy Award for Outstanding Lead Actor in a Limited Series or Movie and the Golden Globe Award for Best Actor in a Miniseries or Television Film. That same year Spacey produced the TV movie Bernard and Doris, an HBO semi-fictionalized account of the relationship that developed between socialite heiress and philanthropist Doris Duke and her self-destructive Irish butler Bernard Lafferty later in her life. The film starred Ralph Fiennes and Susan Sarandon and was directed by Bob Balaban. The film premiered at the Hamptons International Film Festival to critical acclaim, and Spacey was nominated for the Primetime Emmy Award for Outstanding Television Movie. Spacey portrayed the antagonist Jonathan Irons in the 2014 video game Call of Duty: Advanced Warfare through motion capture.

Spacey is well known in Hollywood for his impressions. When he appeared on Inside the Actors Studio, he imitated (at host James Lipton's request) Jack Lemmon, James Stewart, Johnny Carson, Katharine Hepburn, Clint Eastwood, John Gielgud, Marlon Brando, Christopher Walken, and Al Pacino. On The Tonight Show with Jimmy Fallon, Spacey admitted to using his vocal skills as a young actor in New York City to pretend to be Carson's son in order to obtain free theatre tickets and to enter Studio 54. Spacey's Capitol/EMI album Forever Cool (2007) features two duets with Spacey and an earlier recording of Dean Martin: "Ain't That a Kick in the Head" and "King of the Road". In December 2007, Spacey co-hosted the Nobel Peace Prize Concert along with Uma Thurman.

2013–2017: House of Cards and critical acclaim 

On March 18, 2011, it was announced that Spacey was cast as Frank Underwood in the Netflix series House of Cards, adapted from a 1990 BBC political drama of the same name. He was nominated for the Primetime Emmy Award for Outstanding Lead Actor in a Drama Series at the 65th Primetime Emmy Awards in 2013, becoming the first lead actor to be Primetime Emmy-nominated from a web television series. Spacey went on to win the Golden Globe award for Best Actor in a Television Series Drama at the 72nd Golden Globe Awards and Screen Actors Guild nomination for Outstanding Performance by a Male Actor in a Drama Series at the 21st Screen Actors Guild Awards for his season 2 performance.

In 2018, Earl Blue, owner of the security company VIP Protective Services, claimed that Spacey had used racial slurs against his predominantly African-American staff when they were hired on the House of Cards set in 2012, before getting Blue fired.

2017–present: Career setback and comeback attempts 
Following sexual misconduct allegations from 2017, Spacey maintained a lower profile and his career stalled. Spacey appeared in previously shot film Billionaire Boys Club, which was released in 2018 with his scenes unaltered.

In May 2021, it was announced that he had been cast in a supporting role as a police detective in the crime drama film The Man Who Drew God, directed by and starring Franco Nero, which is about a blind artist who is wrongly accused of sexually abusing a child. Spacey has not commented on the role. In August 2021, it was reported that he was filming in California for a small production titled Peter Five Eight, directed by Michael Zaiko Hall. In the movie, Spacey is said to be playing a charismatic serial killer.

On November 3, 2022, Variety reported that Spacey was set to speak at the National Museum of Cinema and was going to receive a lifetime achievement award on January 16, 2023 despite the allegations against him. On November 28, 2022, after winning a sexual battery lawsuit against him filed by Anthony Rapp, Spacey was cast in the British indie thriller Control. The director of the film, Gene Fallaize, dismissed concerns about working with Spacey.

In 2022, Spacey was cast as the late Croatian leader Franjo Tudjman in the political drama Once Upon a Time in Croatia, directed by Jakov Sedlar.

Filmography 

Spacey's career has spanned 30 years across film, television, video games and theatre. His film career started in the late 1980s after small parts in the Mike Nichols films Heartburn (1986) and Working Girl (1988). In the '90s he had supporting roles in films such as Glengarry Glen Ross (1992) opposite Jack Lemmon and Al Pacino and the black comedy film The Ref before being cast in the role of Roger "Verbal" Kint in 1995's The Usual Suspects, which earned him an Academy Award for Best Supporting Actor. That same year he played serial killer John Doe in Se7en opposite Brad Pitt and Morgan Freeman. He went on to star in noir crime drama L.A. Confidential (1997) alongside Russell Crowe and Guy Pearce, Clint Eastwood's Midnight in the Garden of Good and Evil (1997), and American Beauty (1999), for which he earned his second Academy Award, this time for Best Actor.

In the 2000s he appeared in the films Pay It Forward with Helen Hunt (2000), Superman Returns as Lex Luthor (2006), and 21 with Jim Sturgess (2008), the last of which he also produced. In 2004 he wrote, directed and starred in the biopic musical Beyond the Sea (2004). In 2011 he co-starred with Paul Bettany and Jeremy Irons in the drama film Margin Call. That same year he played antagonist Dave Harken in the comedy Horrible Bosses with Jason Bateman, a role he reprised in the 2014 sequel film Horrible Bosses 2. He played Doc in the 2017 film Baby Driver with Ansel Elgort.

From 2013 to 2017 he played Francis "Frank" Underwood in the Netflix series House of Cards alongside Robin Wright. Spacey also starred in the HBO television film Recount (2008) and produced the 2006 film Bernard and Doris.

Awards and nominations 

Spacey has won two Academy Awards, a Tony Award, a Golden Globe Award, four Screen Actors Guild Awards and a British Academy Film Award. He was nominated for a Grammy Award and for 12 Primetime Emmy Awards. Spacey received a star on the Hollywood Walk of Fame in 1999 and was named an honorary Commander and Knight Commander of the Order of the British Empire in 2010 and 2015, respectively.</onlyinclude>

Personal life
An article in The Sunday Times Magazine in 1999 stated that Spacey's "love affair with acting, and the absence of a visible partner in the life of an attractive 40-year-old, has resulted in Esquire magazine asserting two years ago that he must be gay". Spacey responded to the rumors by telling Playboy and other interviewers that he was not gay and by telling Lesley White of The Sunday Times:I chose for a long time not to answer these questions because of the manner in which they were asked, and because I was never talking to someone I trusted, so why should I? Recently I chose to participate because it's a little hard on the people I love.

In 1999, reports suggested Spacey was dating a script supervisor named Dianne Dreyer, with their relationship possibly dating back as far as 1992. In 2000, Spacey brought Dreyer to the Academy Awards; during the acceptance speech for his Best Actor award, Spacey stated, "Dianne, thank you for teaching me about caring about the right things, and I love you."

In 2007, Gotham magazine quoted Spacey saying:I've never believed in pimping my personal life out for publicity. Although I might be interested in doing it, I will never do it. People can gossip all they want; they can speculate all they want. I just happen to believe that there's a separation between the public life and the private life. Everybody has the right to a private life no matter what their professions are.

Political views and activism

Spacey is a Democrat and has been described as left-leaning and mirroring some of those professed by his fictional character in House of Cards.

In 1976 Spacey worked on Jimmy Carter's 1976 presidential campaign.

He is a friend of President Bill Clinton, having met Clinton before his presidency began. Spacey once described Clinton as "one of a shining light" in the political process. He additionally made a cameo appearance in the short film President Clinton: Final Days, a light-hearted political satire produced by the Clinton Administration for the 2000 White House Correspondents Dinner.

Spacey has undertaken activism in the domain of HIV/AIDS. In 2002, Spacey, actor Chris Tucker, and Jeffrey Epstein accompanied Bill Clinton on a trip throughout several African countries to promote AIDS awareness on the continent. He also participated in several fundraisers for HIV/AIDS healthcare, including amfAR Cinema Against AIDS in 2016 and the 25th Annual Elton John AIDS Foundation Academy Award Party in 2017.

Spacey met Venezuelan president Hugo Chávez in September 2007 but never spoke to the press about their encounter. During the trip, he visited the Venezuelan film studio Villa del Cine. In March 2011, following Belarusian president Alexander Lukashenko's crackdown on the Belarusian democracy movement, Spacey joined Jude Law in a street protest in London against Lukashenko's regime.

In October 2008, Spacey started the Kevin Spacey Foundation in the UK to encourage youth involvement in the arts. Headquartered in England and Wales, its purpose was to provide grants to individuals and organizations to help young people study the arts, particularly theatre. The charity shut down in February 2018 following sexual misconduct allegations against Spacey.

In September 2006, Spacey said that he intended to take up British citizenship when it is offered to him. When asked about the UK's 2016 European Union membership referendum, Spacey replied, "I appreciate you asking me the question, but I am not a British citizen, I am a resident of Great Britain. And I have never in my twelve years ever gotten involved in politics in Great Britain. I think it's inappropriate for me as a, really as a guest, in Great Britain, so I'll leave that to the British people."

Sexual misconduct allegations

On October 29, 2017, actor Anthony Rapp alleged that Spacey, while appearing intoxicated, made a sexual advance toward him at a party in 1986, when Rapp was 14 and Spacey was 26. Rapp had also shared this story in a 2001 interview with The Advocate, but Spacey's name was redacted from publication to avoid legal disputes and public outing. Spacey stated through Twitter that he did not remember the encounter, but that he owed Rapp "the sincerest apology for what would have been deeply inappropriate drunken behavior" if he had behaved as asserted. On September 9, 2020, Rapp sued Spacey for sexual assault, sexual battery, and intentional infliction of emotional distress under the Child Victims Act.

Fifteen others then came forward alleging similar abuse, including Boston anchorwoman Heather Unruh, who alleged that Spacey sexually assaulted her son; filmmaker Tony Montana; actor Roberto Cavazos; Richard Dreyfuss's son Harry; and eight people who worked on House of Cards. The Guardian was contacted by "a number of people" who alleged that Spacey "groped and behaved in an inappropriate way with young men" as artistic director of the Old Vic.

Spacey also appears on flight logs from Jeffrey Epstein's private jet from the early 2000s.

Coming out controversy 
On the same day as Rapp's allegations against him, Spacey came out as gay when apologizing to Rapp. He said, "I have had relationships with both men and women. I have loved and had romantic encounters with men throughout my life, and I choose now to live as a gay man." His decision to come out via his statement was criticized by gay celebrities, including Billy Eichner, George Takei, Lance Bass, and Wanda Sykes, as an attempt to change the subject and shift focus from Rapp's accusation, for using his own drunkenness as an excuse for making a sexual advance on a minor, and for implying a connection between homosexuality and child sexual abuse. Some readers additionally felt that by claiming he was "horrified" by Rapp's story, Spacey was attempting to paint himself as the victim of the alleged abuse. In October 2022, Spacey expressed regret over the way he came out and said that it was "never [his] intention" to deflect from the allegations against him or conflate them with his sexual orientation.

Reaction and ramifications 
Amid the allegations, filming was suspended on the sixth and final season of House of Cards. The show's production company had implemented "an anonymous complaint hotline, crisis counselors, and sexual harassment legal advisors for the crew", and stated that in 2012, "someone on the crew shared a complaint about a specific remark and gesture made by Kevin Spacey. Immediate action was taken following our review of the situation and we are confident the issue was resolved promptly to the satisfaction of all involved." According to the production company, Spacey "willingly participated in a training process and since that time MRC has not been made aware of any other complaints" involving him. The show had been due to end in 2018. The season was shortened from 13 episodes to eight, and Spacey was removed from the cast and from his role as executive producer.

The Gore Vidal biographical film Gore, starring Spacey, which was set to be distributed by Netflix, was canceled, and Netflix went on to sever all ties with him. He was due to appear in All the Money in the World as industrialist J. Paul Getty; his scenes were cut and Christopher Plummer replaced him as Getty in reshoots. In an interview with Variety, Plummer said, "It's really not replacing [Spacey]. It's starting all over again." Plummer elaborated saying, "I think it's very sad what happened to him... Kevin is such a talented and a terrifically gifted actor, and it's so sad. It's such a shame. That's all I can say, because that's it."

The International Academy of Television Arts and Sciences reversed its decision to honor Spacey with the 2017 International Emmy Founders Award. On November 2, 2017, Variety reported that his publicist Staci Wolfe and talent agency Creative Artists Agency were ending their relationships with him.

Christmas Eve YouTube videos 

From 2018 to 2020, Spacey posted an annual video to his YouTube channel on Christmas Eve.

On December 24, 2018, Spacey uploaded a video titled "Let Me Be Frank", in which he – while in character as Frank Underwood – appeared to deny the real-life allegations leveled against him. The video was described as "bizarre", "stomach-churning", and "creepy". As of December 2022, the video has over 13 million views.

One year later, on December 24, 2019, Spacey posted another video, titled "KTWK" (short for "kill them with kindness"), to his YouTube channel, once again in character as Underwood. In 2020, Spacey posted a third Christmas Eve video, titled "1-800 XMAS", in which he spoke in Underwood's accent before breaking character and speaking in his natural voice. He then expressed sympathy for people struggling amidst the COVID-19 pandemic and promoted two suicide and substance abuse hotlines. The annual videos have been described as "tone-deaf" by Eric Hegedus in the New York Post with respect to the allegations against him.

Spacey did not release a new video on Christmas Eve in 2021, or in 2022.

Legal issues
The Los Angeles District Attorney's office stated in April 2018 that it would investigate an allegation that Spacey had sexually assaulted an adult male in 1992. In July 2018, three more allegations of sexual assault against Spacey were revealed by Scotland Yard, bringing the total number of open investigations in the UK to six. In September 2018, a lawsuit filed at Los Angeles Superior Court claimed that Spacey sexually assaulted an unnamed masseur at a house in Malibu, California, in October 2016.

In December 2018, Spacey was charged with a felony for allegedly sexually assaulting journalist Heather Unruh's 18-year-old son in Nantucket, Massachusetts, in July 2016. Spacey pleaded not guilty to the charge on January 7, 2019. Unruh's son told police he was texting with his girlfriend throughout the alleged "groping" incident. Spacey's defense attorneys spent months trying to obtain copies of the texts and the phone itself. In mid-May 2019, Unruh's son's personal attorney informed the court that the cell phone in question is "missing". On June 4, 2019, the defense learned that when Unruh gave her son's cell phone to police in 2017, she admitted she had deleted some of the text messages. Later that month, her son filed a lawsuit against Spacey, claiming emotional damages. On July 5, 2019, he voluntarily dismissed the claims with prejudice.

On July 17, 2019, the criminal assault charge against Spacey was dropped by the Cape and Islands prosecutors. When the anonymous massage therapist who accused him died, the last remaining criminal case against Spacey was closed.

On September 9, 2020, Anthony Rapp accused Spacey in a complaint about actions that allegedly happened in 1986 (sexual assault and sexual battery) and intentional infliction of emotional distress under the Child Victims Act, which extended New York's statute of limitations for suits related to child sexual abuse. Joining Rapp in the suit against Spacey was a man who requested to remain anonymous who accused Spacey of sexually abusing him in 1983, when he was 14 and Spacey was 24. On June 17, 2021, the anonymous accuser was dismissed from the case due to his refusal to publicly identify himself. As Rapp's trial lawsuit against Spacey commenced in October 2022, it was revealed that he had given an inaccurate description of the apartment where he alleged the abuse took place. On October 17, the judge dismissed the emotional distress charges due to them being a "duplicate" of the battery charges. On October 20, a jury found Spacey not liable.

In 2020, Spacey and his production companies M. Profitt Productions and Trigger Street Productions were ordered to pay $31 million to MRC, the studio that produced House of Cards, for violating its sexual harassment policy. Spacey appealed to have the arbitration award overturned, but the request was denied on August 4, 2022.

On May 26, 2022, Spacey was charged by the Crown Prosecution Service (CPS) in the United Kingdom with four counts of sexual assault against three complainants. The alleged offenses occurred between 2005 and 2013 in London and Gloucestershire. According to the Crown Prosecution Service, it would be possible to formally charge Spacey only if he entered England or Wales, which would entail extradition if Spacey refused to do so voluntarily. Nevertheless, in a statement to Good Morning America on May 31, 2022, Spacey said that he would "voluntarily appear in the U.K. as soon as can be arranged". In his first British court appearance on June 16, Spacey denied the allegations against him. On July 14, 2022, Spacey pleaded not guilty to the charges in London. He is due to face trial beginning June 6, 2023. On November 16, 2022, the CPS authorized an additional seven charges against Spacey, all related to a single complainant arising from incidents alleged to have occurred between 2001 and 2004.

Discography

Albums
 Beyond the Sea: Original Motion Picture Soundtrack (2004)

Singles
"That Old Black Magic" (1997, from the Midnight in the Garden of Good and Evil soundtrack)

Live performances
 "Mind Games" – Come Together: A Night for John Lennon's Words and Music – October 2, 2001, Radio City Music Hall

References

External links

 
 
 
 

 
1959 births
Living people
20th-century American male actors
21st-century American male actors
Actor-managers
Actors awarded knighthoods
Male actors from Los Angeles County, California
Actors Studio alumni
American expatriate male actors in the United Kingdom
American impressionists (entertainers)
American male film actors
American male stage actors
American male video game actors
American male voice actors
American people of Welsh descent
American theatre directors
American artistic directors
Best Actor Academy Award winners
Best Actor BAFTA Award winners
Best Drama Actor Golden Globe (television) winners
Best Supporting Actor Academy Award winners
Critics' Circle Theatre Award winners
Film producers from California
American gay actors
American gay writers
American gay musicians
Golden Orange Honorary Award winners
HIV/AIDS activists
Honorary Knights Commander of the Order of the British Empire
Juilliard School alumni
Laurence Olivier Award winners
LGBT people from California
LGBT people from New Jersey
LGBT film producers
American LGBT singers
Los Angeles Valley College people
Male actors from California
Male actors from New Jersey
New Jersey Democrats
Outstanding Performance by a Cast in a Motion Picture Screen Actors Guild Award winners
Outstanding Performance by a Male Actor in a Drama Series Screen Actors Guild Award winners
Outstanding Performance by a Male Actor in a Leading Role Screen Actors Guild Award winners
People from South Orange, New Jersey
Tony Award winners
Gay singers
LGBT film directors
LGBT theatre directors
Obscenity controversies in film
Sexual-related controversies in film